The Smyrk is a band from New Haven, Connecticut. The members are Doron Flake, Ari Sadowitz, Chris Barone and David Marvuglio.

History
The Smyrk formed in 2003, when singer Doron Flake joined up with instrumental trio of guitarist/bassists Nick Logan and Ari Sadowitz, along with drummer Chris Barone, who had been playing the Connecticut club circuit under the name "Canine Smirk."

The Smyrk announced their breakup on July 21, 2008, with a final show on July 29.
In January 2009, The Smyrk announced its reformation.

Independent success
Monsters on Maple Street the band's debut EP was produced with Eric Rachel (Saves the Day, Dillinger Escape Plan) and mastered by Alan Douches (Thrice, Run DMC) at West West Side Music. The self-released record garnered praise from sources such as AbsolutePunk.net.

After the EP circulated around the internet and the band toured the Northeast, playing over 300 shows, Monsters on Maple Street caught the ear of Incubus bassist and former Roots guitarist Ben Kenney. The band then set out on tour, performing across the country and back, including performing in Los Angeles for Kenney, who invited them to record at his home in August 2006. Monsters on Maple Street was picked up for distribution by Mr. Kenney's label, Ghetto Crush, and quickly became a top seller on the label's website, .

The Smyrk traveled to Los Angeles in August 2006 to record six new tracks for the album New Fiction. This album was recorded over a month in Mr. Kenney's home studio.

In October 2007, The Smyrk was chosen as one of the top 6 out of approximately 4,000 bands to compete in MTV2's Dew Circuit Breakout, a TV battle of the bands sponsored by Mountain Dew.  MTV2's contest has brought to the music spotlight bands such as Halifax (Band), the 2006 winner and Taking Back Sunday.

In late 2008, The Smyrk recorded 2 new songs with Bryan Russell (Envy on the Coast, Straylight Run, Coldplay).

The band showcased at the 2009 South By Southwest music festival in Austin, Texas.

In January 2009, singer Doron Flake was featured on Stratford, CT alternative/metal band Tempest Edge's track "Against the Wall," off of their E.P. The Creation.

They released 2 new songs, again recorded with Bryan Russell, in fall 2009.

In late 2009, The Smyrk did an interview with underground music website Madeloud.com. In 2010, the guitarist and bass player left the band, leaving the remaining members to perform with substitute musicians.

In late 2011 The Smyrk announced that they would be fully reuniting, with the lineup consisting of original members Doron Flake, Ari Sadowitz, and Chris Barone, as well as new bass player Mike Russo. In 2012, the band played shows at clubs in the Northeast, and wrote new, as-of-yet unreleased material. This was followed by a brief hiatus. The Smyrk regrouped in 2014, welcoming bassist David Marvuglio into the band.

Nerd Rock
The Smyrk composes songs about numerous topics, but frequently write about literary and cinematic characters from comic books and sci-fi/cult films.

"Dial V for Venom" is the jilted symbiote's song of rejection after his separation from Peter Parker. The song references the sleight of Spider-Man's "red right hand, tap-tap and thumbs out", being "close as the blood" (Venom (Marvel Comics character) symbiotes have hidden in host's bloodstreams)and being Parker's armor. It even calls their relationship a Rorschach spot, demonstrating how it proved Venom was mentally abnormal from his alien race, bonding with Parker instead of just wanting to feed on him.

"The Ballad of Fletcher Reede" is a reimagining of Jim Carrey's predicament in the film Liar Liar. The song makes reference to "The Claw" and uses the quote "I hold myself in contempt, why should (this court) be any different??"

"The End of Jason Todd" is an open letter from Joker to Batman after he murdered the second Robin. Specifically, Joker refers to Batman's "soldiers" being unprepared for war and the difference between being the joke and the punchline. Also, Joker seems to be an Erykah Badu fan, as he mentions being "an artist and I'm sensitive about it."

"Farewell to Arm" is Ashley J. Williams' explanation of what happened at the doomed cabin from the Evil Dead series.

"Single Serving Friend" is a chronicle of the last hour of Fight Club. It even makes melodic reference to The Pixies' song Where is my Mind? from the ending scene.

The Smyrk has tweeted about new songs based on characters from Thor, Kill Bill, Namor & the Fantastic Four and Scott Pilgrim.

Media coverage

Discography

References

External links
 Official website
 The Smyrk at MySpace
 The Smyrk MTV'2 Dew Circuit Breakout at MTV2

Musicians from New Haven, Connecticut
Alternative rock groups from Connecticut